Panogena jasmini is a moth of the family Sphingidae. It is known from Madagascar.

The body and forewings are whitish grey (paler than Panogena lingens). The abdomen has whitish grey lateral patches. The hindwing upperside has an all yellow base.

Subspecies
Panogena jasmini jasmini
Panogena jasmini meridionalis Denso, 1944

References

Sphingini
Moths described in 1875
Moths of Madagascar
Moths of Africa